Tatars is an umbrella term for different Turkic ethnic groups bearing the name "Tatar".

Tatar may also refer to:

Languages and peoples
Tatar confederation, one of major Mongol tribes of the 13th century
Crimean Tatar language, language of the Crimean Tatars
Siberian Tatar language, language of the Siberian Tatars
Old Tatar language, literary language used among the Muslim Tatars from the Middle Ages until the 19th century
Tatar alphabet, scripts currently used for the Tatar language
Tatar language
Tatar (Hazara tribe), a tribe of Hazara people in Afghanistan

Places

Azerbaijan
Tatar, Azerbaijan (disambiguation), various Tatar named places in Azerbaijan
Tatar, Jabrayil, a village in Azerbaijan
Tatar, Qubadli, a village in Azerbaijan
Tatar, Zangilan, a village in Azerbaijan

Iran
Shahrak Tatar, a village in Iran
Tatar, Khuzestan, a village in Iran
Tatar, North Khorasan, a village in Iran
Tatar Bayjeq, a village in Iran
Tatar-e Olya, Golestan, a village in Iran
Tatar-e Sofla, Golestan, a village in Iran
Tatar-e Olya, East Azerbaijan, a village in Iran
Tatar-e Sofla, East Azerbaijan, a village in Iran
Tatar, West Azerbaijan, a village in Iran

Poland
Tatar, Łódź Voivodeship, a village in Poland

Turkey
Tatar, Amasya, a village in Amasya Province, Turkey
Tatar, Çorum

People

Given name
Tatar Khan, Governor of Sonargaon during 1259-1268 CE
Tatar Khan Naghir (d. 1611), Eastern Afghan Confederates soldier

Surname
Daniel Tătar (born 1987), Romanian footballer
Ersin Tatar (born 1960), Turkish Cypriot politician and Prime Minister of Northern Cyprus
Gülsüm Tatar (born 1985), Turkish female boxer
Maria Tatar, American academic
Nur Tatar (born 1992), Turkish female taekwondo practitioner
Peter Tatár (born 1953), Slovak politician
Stanisław Tatar (1896–1980), Polish general
Tomáš Tatar (born 1990), Slovak ice hockey player

See also 
Norwegian and Swedish Travellers, Romani people sometimes referred to as tatere or tattare
Rouran Khaganate, from Chinese rendering of Tatar
Tartar (disambiguation)
Tater (disambiguation)
Tartary
Tatra (company)

Language and nationality disambiguation pages